In chess, a discovered attack is a direct attack revealed when one piece moves out of the way of another. Discovered attacks can be extremely powerful, as the piece moved can make a threat independently of the piece it reveals. Like many chess tactics, they often succeed because the opponent would be unable to meet two threats at once unless one of the attacked pieces can simultaneously move away from its own attack and capture the other attacking piece. If the discovered attack is a check, it is called a discovered check.

Types

When the moving piece gives check to the opponent's king, the maneuver is often described as a discovered attack with check.  When the discovered attack is itself a check, it is called a discovered check.  If both pieces give check, a double check results.

Discovered attacks—especially checks—can win material when the moving piece captures an opposing piece nominally protected by another opposing piece. If the opponent deals with the discovered attack (obligatory if it is a check), the attacking player will have time to return the moving piece out of harm's way.  This scenario is often referred to as a discovered attack (or check) with capture.  A discovered check can also win material if the moving piece ends up attacking another undefended piece.  In this case, it would be impossible for the opponent first to capture the moving piece unless the king can capture. 

When the moving piece moves to a square from which it threatens to inflict checkmate on the next move, the tactic is called a discovered attack with mate threat.  A discovered checkmate itself is also possible.

Less often, a move may discover multiple attacks, as in the first diagram where the knight's departure opens two crisscrossing diagonals. And in exceptional circumstances, it is even possible for two checks to be revealed simultaneously. The only way for this to happen in orthodox chess is by way of an en passant capture. In the position shown in the second diagram, Black has just played 1...g7–g5. White replies 2.hxg6++. The result is a double check: One check is given by the rook, discovered by the capturing pawn's move; the other by the bishop, created by the captured pawn's removal. (The bishop’s check is not a discovered check, as the black pawn is captured and not moved.) Such a check is extremely rare in practical play, but it is sometimes found in problems.

Example

The diagram illustrates a trap in the Advance Variation of the French Defence, based on a discovered attack. If, after 1.e4 e6 2.d4 d5 3.e5 c5 4.c3 Nc6 5.Nf3 Qb6 6.Bd3 cxd4 7.cxd4, Black mistakenly attempts to win White's d-pawn with 7...Nxd4 8.Nxd4 Qxd4 (diagram), White can play 9.Bb5+, a discovered attack (White's bishop gets out of the way of White's queen) against Black's queen with check. Black must get out of check, then White can follow up with 10.Qxd4.

References

Further reading

External links
Chess Tactics Repository – Discovered Attacks – Collection of chess problems involving discovered attacks

Chess tactics
Chess terminology